George's Brook-Milton is a town on Smith Sound, Trinity Bay, in the Canadian province of Newfoundland and Labrador. It was incorporated as a town in 2018 from the neighbouring unincorporated communities of George's Brook and Milton.

History 
In 2017, residents of the neighbouring communities of George's Brook and Milton voted in favour of joining together to incorporate as a town. The Town of George's Brook-Milton was officially incorporated by the provincial government on May 8, 2018.

See also 
 List of cities and towns in Newfoundland and Labrador

References

External links 

Populated coastal places in Canada
Populated places in Newfoundland and Labrador
Logging communities in Canada
Populated places established in 1868
1868 establishments in the United Kingdom